Spermacoce neoterminalis, the Everglades Key false buttonweed, is a species of plant in the Rubiaceae. It is endemic to southern Florida, from the Everglades as far north as Lake Okeechobee.

Spermacoce neoterminalis is a perennial herb with a woody root. Stems are up to 40 cm tall, generally not branching above the ground. Leaves are elliptical. Flowers are small, white, clustered in terminal and axillary glomerules.

References

External links
Natives for your Neighborhood, Institute for Regional Conservation, Delray Beach Florida USA, Everglades Keys false buttonweed, Spermacoce terminalis 
Dave's Garden, Everglades Keys false buttonweed (Spermacoce terminalis)
Gardening Europe 
Altervista Flora of the USA and Canada, Spermacoce terminalis (Small) Kartesz & Gandhi 

neoterminalis
Endemic flora of Florida
Everglades National Park
Flora without expected TNC conservation status